Massachusetts Senate's Plymouth and Norfolk district in the United States is one of 40 legislative districts of the Massachusetts Senate. It covers 9.1% of Norfolk County and 20.5% of Plymouth County population. Republican Patrick O'Connor of Weymouth has represented the district since 2016.

Candidates for this district seat in the 2020 Massachusetts general election include Meg Wheeler.

Towns represented
The district includes the following localities:
 Cohasset
 Duxbury
 Hingham
 Hull
 Marshfield
 Norwell
 Scituate
 Weymouth

Senators 
 Anna Buckley
 Robert L. Hedlund, Jr., circa 2002 
 Patrick M. O'Connor, 2016-current

See also
 List of Massachusetts Senate elections
 List of Massachusetts General Courts
 List of former districts of the Massachusetts Senate
 Norfolk County districts of the Massachusetts House of Representatives: 1st, 2nd, 3rd, 4th, 5th, 6th, 7th, 8th, 9th, 10th, 11th, 12th, 13th, 14th, 15th
 Plymouth County districts of the Massachusetts House of Representatives: 1st, 2nd, 3rd, 4th, 5th, 6th, 7th, 8th, 9th, 10th, 11th, 12th

Images
Portraits of legislators

References

External links
 Ballotpedia
  (State Senate district information based on U.S. Census Bureau's American Community Survey).

Senate
Government of Norfolk County, Massachusetts
Government of Plymouth County, Massachusetts
Massachusetts Senate